The Subcommittee on Worker and Family Support is a subcommittee of the Committee on Ways and Means in the United States House of Representatives. From 2007 to 2011, it was known as the Subcommittee on Income Security and Family Support. Full committee chairman David Camp renamed the subcommittee in 2011, returning it to the Subcommittee on Human Resources, the name it held prior to the 110th Congress. In 2019 the subcommittee was named the Subcommittee on Worker and Family Support, before Republicans gave it its current name in 2023.

Jurisdiction
From the Committee rules:
The jurisdiction of the Subcommittee on Human Resources shall include bills and matters referred to the Committee on Ways and Means that relate to the public assistance provisions of the Social Security Act, including Temporary Assistance for Needy Families, child care, child and family services, child support, foster care, adoption, supplemental security income social services, eligibility of welfare recipients for food stamps, and low-income energy assistance.  More specifically, the jurisdiction of the Subcommittee on Human Resources shall include bills and matters relating to titles I, IV, VI, X, XIV, XVI, XVII, XX and related provisions of titles VII and XI of the Social Security Act.
The jurisdiction of the Subcommittee on Human Resources shall also include bills and matters referred to the Committee on Ways and Means that relate to the Federal-State system of unemployment compensation, and the financing thereof, including the programs for extended and emergency benefits.  More specifically, the jurisdiction of the Subcommittee on Human Resources shall also include all bills and matters pertaining to the programs of unemployment compensation under titles III, IX and XII of the Social Security Act, Chapters 23 and 23A of the Internal Revenue Code, and the Federal-State Extended Unemployment Compensation Act of 1970, and provisions relating thereto.

Members, 117th Congress

Historical membership rosters

115th Congress

116th Congress

References

External links 
 Ways and Means Committee Website: Subcommittee Page

Ways and Means Worker